Luis David Frías (born May 23, 1998) is a Dominican professional baseball pitcher for the Arizona Diamondbacks of Major League Baseball (MLB). He made his MLB debut in 2021.

Career
Frías signed with the Arizona Diamondbacks as an international free agent in 2015. The Diamondbacks added him to their 40-man roster after the 2020 season. On February 22, 2021, Frías was placed on the reserve/COVID-19 list as he continued to recover from the virus. Frías was called up for his MLB debut on September 19, 2021.

References

External links

1998 births
Living people
Amarillo Sod Poodles players
Arizona Diamondbacks players
Arizona League Diamondbacks players
Dominican Republic expatriate baseball players in the United States
Dominican Summer League Diamondbacks players
Hillsboro Hops players
Kane County Cougars players
Major League Baseball players from the Dominican Republic
Major League Baseball pitchers
People from María Trinidad Sánchez Province
Reno Aces players